The Wrocław University of Environmental and Life Sciences (former Agricultural University and Agricultural Academy in Wrocław) is a state university established as an independent university in 1951. UPWr is one of the best specialist universities in Poland. It conducts training and research in the field of food, environmental and veterinary sciences.

In the Perspektywy ranking – the most prestigious and comprehensive ranking of universities in Poland – in 2020 UPWr was placed second in the group of natural and agricultural universities and the 25th among all universities in the country. In addition, two degree programmes – geodesy and cartography and food science – have been voted the best in the country.

For several years, the university has been listed in the international Shanghai Ranking among the best universities in the world in the fields of: Food Science & Technology, Veterinary Science and Chemical Engineering.

History 
1856–1945. The Lviv Academy of Veterinary Medicine was established in 1881 as the third institution of this kind in Poland, alongside those in Vilnus and Warsaw. The Faculty of Agriculture dates back to 1856, when the Rural Agricultural School was opened in Dublany near Lvov, in the eastern outskirts of Poland. Initiated by the Galicia Parliament and later confirmed by the decree of the Minister of Agriculture, the school was transformed into the School of Agriculture, which later gained the status of the Polish Academy of Agriculture in 1901. The academy was incorporated into the Lviv Polytechnic, together with the School of Forestry, which resulted in the establishment of the Faculty of Agriculture and Forestry in 1919. The last transformation was decreed by the Council of Ministers.

Breslau. In 1881 the Institute of Agriculture was
opened at the Royal University of Breslau. The address of the institute was 5 Mattiaplatz, and in 1923–1945 at 25 Hansastrasse (today C.K. Norwida Street), which is now the location of the main building of Wroclaw University of Environmental and Life Sciences. The academic research facilities and scholars were placed there to provide the foundation for future university development.

1945–1951 Wroclaw. On 24 August 1945 the State National Council signed a decree to establish a completely new institution of higher education called the State University and Polytechnic in Wroclaw. The university comprised ten faculties, having as parts the Faculty of Veterinary Medicine and the Faculty of Agriculture with the Gardening Division. The
building of the Institute of Agriculture housed academic facilities and the
scholars from the Faculty of Agriculture and Forestry of the Lvov Polytechnic, together with the professors of the Academy of Veterinary Medicine in Lwów who became the academic staff of the newly established university. In 1945, 302 students enrolled on the first year to study veterinary medicine and agriculture.

After 1951 the School of Agriculture was separated from the State University and Polytechnic in Wroclaw by a decree by the Council of Ministers on 17 November 1951 and became a separate entity. The newly created institution included four faculties: the Faculty of Agriculture, the Faculty of Veterinary Medicine, the Faculty of Water Reclamation and the Faculty of Zoology. The School of Agriculture gained the status of Wroclaw Academy of Agriculture on 28 September 1972 by a decree of the Council of Ministers. The government bill on 23 November 2006 nominated Wroclaw Academy of Agriculture as Wroclaw University of Environmental and Life Sciences. Currently, the university is an interdisciplinary institution with a focus on environment and nature studies. The structure of the university comprises five faculties and several interdepartmental units.

Group of Rectors 

 1951–1954: prof. dr hab. Stanisław Tołpa – botanist
 1954–1955: prof. dr hab. Alfred Senze – physiopathologist
 1955–1959: prof. dr hab. Aleksander Tychowski – agricultural technologist
 1959–1965: prof. dr hab. Alfred Senze – physiopathologist
 1965–1969: prof. dr hab. Tadeusz Garbuliński – veterinary pharmacologist
 1969–1981: prof. dr hab. Ryszard Badura – veterinary surgeon
 1981–1981: prof. dr hab. Józef Dzieżyc – agrotechnician
 1982–1984: prof. dr hab. Henryk Balbierz – pathophysiologist
 1984–1986: prof. dr hab. Bronisław Jabłoński – agrotechnician
 1986–1990: prof. dr hab. Jerzy Juszczak – animal technician
 1990–1996: prof. dr hab. Jerzy Kowalski – hydrologist
 1996–2002: prof. dr hab. Tadeusz Szulc – animal technician
 2002–2008: prof. dr hab. Michał Mazurkiewicz – poultry pathologist
 2008–2016: prof. dr hab. Roman Kołacz – animal technician
 2016–2020: prof. dr hab. inż. Tadeusz Trziszka – food technologist
 Od 2020: prof. dr hab. inż. Jarosław Bosy – surveyor

Courses of study 
Currently, the university offers the possibility of studying in twenty-three first-cycle (bachelor's or engineering) and second-cycle (supplementary master's) majors and uniform master's studies at five faculties:

Possessed permissions and leading disciplines 
The Wrocław University of Life Sciences is authorized to conduct first-cycle and second-cycle studies in 28 fields of study, conduct third-cycle studies (UPWr Doctoral School), and conduct post-graduate studies. These powers are contained in seven leading disciplines from three areas:

Field of Agricultural Sciences:
veterinary science
 animal science and fisheries
 agriculture and horticulture
 nutrition and food technology
 The field of exact and natural sciences:
 biological sciences
 Field of engineering and technical sciences:
 environmental engineering, mining and energy
 civil engineering and transport

References

External links

Recruitment to the Wrocław University of Environmental and Life Sciences
Movies about the Wrocław University of Environmental and Life Sciences

Universities and colleges in Wrocław
Agricultural universities and colleges in Poland
Universities and colleges in Poland